Winnall is a northern suburb of Winchester, Hampshire, on the east bank of the River Itchen. It is the location of the Winnall Moors nature reserve on the flood-plain of the Itchen and the University of Southampton's Erasmus Park hall of residence. Winnall is also the location of St Swithun's School , Winnal Primary school and Winchester's main industrial estate, occupying land between the A34 and the former Didcot, Newbury and Southampton Railway, by junction 9 of the M3.

The name is presumed to derive from Wilighealh, a Saxon name probably relating to willows, mentioned in the Domesday Book as part of nearby Chilcomb. It appears in its modern spelling on a 1575 map by Saxton. Winnall was an ancient parish (incorporating that of St Giles by the late 13th century), but was later absorbed by Winchester, and is not a modern civil parish.

References

City of Winchester